Wizards is an anthology of themed fantasy and science fiction short stories on the subject of wizards edited by Isaac Asimov, Martin H. Greenberg and Charles G. Waugh. The first volume in their Isaac Asimov's Magical Worlds of Fantasy series, it was first published in paperback by Signet/New American Library in October 1983. It was later gathered together with Witches, the second book in the series, into the omnibus hardcover collection Isaac Asimov's Magical Worlds of Fantasy: Witches & Wizards (1985).

The book collects ten novellas, novelettes and short stories by various fantasy and science fiction authors, with an introduction by Asimov.

Contents
"Introduction" (Isaac Asimov)
"Mazirian the Magician" (Jack Vance)
"Please Stand By" (Ron Goulart)
"What Good Is a Glass Dagger?" (Larry Niven)
"The Eye of Tandyla" (L. Sprague de Camp)
"The White Horse Child" (Greg Bear)
"Semley's Necklace" (Ursula K. Le Guin)
"And the Monsters Walk" (John Jakes)
"The Seeker in the Fortress" (Manly Wade Wellman)
"The Wall Around the World" (Theodore R. Cogswell)
"The People of the Black Circle" (Robert E. Howard)

References

1983 anthologies
Fantasy anthologies
Science fiction anthologies
Martin H. Greenberg anthologies
Isaac Asimov anthologies
Signet Books books